Vladimir Petrovich Kondrashin (14 January 1929 in Leningrad, Soviet Union – 23 December 1999 in Saint Petersburg, Russia) was a Soviet and Russian professional basketball player and coach. He was inducted into the FIBA Hall of Fame in 2007.

Playing career
Kondrashin played club basketball with Spartak Leningrad. As a player, he received the Master of Sports of the USSR award in 1952.

Coaching career

Club level
At the club level, Kondrashin was the head coach of Spartak Leningrad (later named Spartak Saint Petersburg), from 1967 to 1995. With Spartak, he won the European-wide secondary level FIBA European Cup Winners' Cup, in 1973 and 1975, and the USSR / CIS League, in 1975 and 1992.

Soviet Union national basketball team
Kondrashin coached the senior men's Soviet Union national basketball team, from 1971 to 1976. He led them to their first Summer Olympics gold medal, at the 1972 Summer Olympics, when they beat the United States, in the 1972 Summer Olympics' controversial final game, on a last second shot by Alexander Belov. He also coached the Soviet Union to a gold medal at the 1974 FIBA World Championship, a bronze medal at the 1976 Summer Olympics, a gold medal at the EuroBasket 1971, a bronze medal at the EuroBasket 1973, and a silver medal at the EuroBasket 1975.

In addition to coaching the senior Soviet national team, he also coached the Soviet national university team, which he led to a gold medal at the 1970 World University Games, and a silver medal at the 1973 World University Games.

Awards and accomplishments
Master of Sports of the USSR: (1952)
Honored Coach of the USSR: (1971)
Order of the Red Banner of Labour: (1972)
Order of the Badge of Honour: (1985)
Order of Friendship of Peoples: (1985)
Order of Friendship: (1995)
FIBA Order of Merit: (1999)
Honorary Citizen of St. Petersburg: (1999)
Contributor to Russian Basketball: (2007)
FIBA Hall of Fame: (2007)

See also 
 FIBA Basketball World Cup winning head coaches
 List of FIBA EuroBasket winning head coaches

External links
 FIBA Hall of Fame page on Kondrashin

1929 births
1999 deaths
Basketball players from Saint Petersburg
BC Spartak Saint Petersburg coaches
BC Spartak Saint Petersburg players
FIBA EuroBasket-winning coaches
FIBA Hall of Fame inductees
Medalists at the 1972 Summer Olympics
Medalists at the 1976 Summer Olympics
Olympic bronze medalists for the Soviet Union
Olympic gold medalists for the Soviet Union
Merited Coaches of the Soviet Union
Recipients of the Order of Friendship of Peoples
Recipients of the Order of the Red Banner of Labour
Russian basketball coaches
Russian men's basketball players
Soviet basketball coaches
Soviet men's basketball players
Coaches at the 1972 Summer Olympics
Coaches at the 1976 Summer Olympics
Olympic medalists in basketball